The following lists events that happened during 1972 in Singapore.

Incumbents
President: Benjamin Henry Sheares
Prime Minister: Lee Kuan Yew

Events

January
1 January – The Post Office Savings Bank is turned into a statutory board. This allows the bank more freedom to run its operations.

February
7 February – The National Wages Council is set up to ensure sustainable wages. This comes after wages have risen quickly the previous year.

April
1 April – The Telephone Department is converted into a statutory board called the Telecommunication Authority of Singapore.
2 April – The Singapore Grand Prix is won by Max Stewart.

May
 12 May – The National Productivity Board is formed to encourage productivity.

June
15 June – The SAF Act comes into effect, allowing for effective management of the Singapore Armed Forces. The Act merges the air, sea and land vocations and establishes the Armed Forces Council.

July
2 July – Singapore Armed Forces Reservist Association is officially launched.
20 July – The Stop at Two policy is unveiled to encourage people to have smaller families.

August
17 August – Work starts on the Brani Naval Base.

September
1 September – The Sentosa Development Corporation is formed to manage Sentosa and the outlying islands to attract tourists.
2 September – The People's Action Party wins the 1972 General Election.
15 September – The first Merlion Park is officially opened.
18 September – 22-year-old Cheng Li Zhen is shot dead while walking through Queenstown; the crime remains unsolved.

October
1 October – Singapore Airlines starts its first flights.
13 October – Heavy fog, an environmental phenomenon that had built up since the beginning of the month, causes gridlock and other problems throughout Singapore.
24 October – Disincentives are announced to nudge families into having only two children, taking effect on 1 August 1973. Among them are progressive reduction of income tax relief to the first three children; increase in childbirth fees depending on births; reduction of paid maternity leave from three to two confinements; and lowering priority of HDB flats allocations for large families (more than two children).

November
21 November – A fire engulfs the Robinson's Department Store, causing 9 deaths. In addition, the impact of the fire damaged the roof of the Overseas Union Bank building and forced the Stock Exchange to stop trading for the day. As a result, this makes the fire one of the worst in Singapore's history.

December
15 December -
OCBC acquires Four Seas Communications Bank.
SATS Ltd is established as a separate company from Singapore Airlines to manage ground operations and inflight catering services.

Date unknown
 The OG building is officially opened.
 Three Rifles Holdings is founded, becoming a company selling clothes.
 Specialists' Shopping Centre is opened in Orchard Road. It has since been demolished.
 The first Guardian store is opened by Cold Storage.
 Shaw Centre is opened.

Births
 22 February – Dasmond Koh, actor.
 26 April – Diana Ser, journalist, media personality.
 15 September – Kit Chan, singer.
 30 September – Darren Lim, actor.
 6 November – Janil Puthucheary, politician.
 18 December – Lawrence Wong, Minister for Finance.
 Alvin Pang - Singaporean poet.

Deaths
4 April – Lionel Chan - racing driver, 28 (injuries sustained in a crash during the Singapore Grand Prix)
5 May – Chen Su Lan - one of Singapore's first local medical graduates, philanthropist, social reformer (b. 1885).
5 September – Bashir Ahmad Mallal - founder of Malayan Law Journal (b. 1898).

References

 
Singapore
Years in Singapore